Franklin D. Roosevelt (1882–1945) was the president of the United States from 1933 to 1945.

Franklin Roosevelt, Franklin D. Roosevelt or Franklin Delano Roosevelt may also refer to:

Things named after the president

 , an aircraft carrier
 Franklin D. Roosevelt State Park, Yorktown, New York
 Franklin Delano Roosevelt Park, South Philadelphia, Pennsylvania
 Parque Franklin Delano Roosevelt, Ciudad de la Costa, near Montevideo, Uruguay
 Franklin Delano Roosevelt Bridge, connecting Maine and New Brunswick
 Avenue Franklin Roosevelt, Brussels
 Franklin D. Roosevelt Lake, Washington state
 Franklin D. Roosevelt (Paris Métro), a Métro station
 Franklin D. Roosevelt High School (Dallas), Texas
 Franklin Delano Roosevelt High School (New York City), Brooklyn, New York
 Franklin Delano Roosevelt High School (Hyde Park, New York)

Relatives of the president
 Franklin D. Roosevelt Jr. (1914–1988), American politician, fifth child of Franklin D. Roosevelt
 Franklin D. Roosevelt III (born 1938), American economist, grandson of Franklin D. Roosevelt

Roosevelt, Franklin